Elections in Mexico are held every 6 years to elect a president and every 3 years to elect a legislature. These elections determine who, on the national level, takes the position of the head of state – the president – as well as the legislature.

Federal Level 
The federal government of Mexico is made up of three branches of government: the executive, legislative, and judicial branches.

The executive branch is headed by the president who is also the chief of state and of the army. The legislative branch consists of the Congress of the Union and is divided into an upper and lower chamber. The judicial branch is headed by the Supreme Court of Justice of the Nation and does not participate in federal elections.

Executive branch 
The president of Mexico is elected for a six-year term by direct election of the population. The candidate who wins a plurality of votes is elected president. No president can serve more than a single term in office, therefore every presidential election in Mexico is a non-incumbent election.

Mexico does not have an office of vice president.

Eligibility 
Candidates for president must be at least 35 years old. They must be Mexican citizens by birth, as must one of their parents. They must have been residents of Mexico for at least 20 years. They also cannot have been either the governor of a state or the chief of government of Mexico City for six months prior to the election.

Legislative branch 
The lawmaking authority of Mexico is vested in the Congress of the Union (Congreso de la Unión) which is composed of two chambers.

Chamber of Deputies 
The Chamber of Deputies (Cámara de Diputados) has 500 members, elected for a three-year term. 300 deputies are elected in single-seat constituencies by plurality. The constituencies are divided among the 32 states based on population. The remaining 200 deputies are elected by proportional representation in five multi-state, 40-seat constituencies.

To be eligible to place candidates in the multi-seat districts a party must have candidates in at least 200 of the 300 single-seat districts and must win at least 2% of the vote in those elections. The 200 PR-seats are distributed based on the percentage of the total national votes earned by each party without taking into account the 300 plurality-seats (parallel voting). However, since 1996, a party cannot get more seats overall than 8% above its result nationally (i.e., to win 50% of the legislative seats, a party must win at least 42% of the vote nationwide). There are three exceptions on this rule: first, a party can only lose PR-seats due to this rule (and no plurality-seats); second, a party can never get more than 300 seats overall (even if it has more than 52% of the vote nationally); and third, a party can exceed this 8% rule if it wins the seats in the single-member districts. Deputies may serve up to four consecutive terms.

Chamber of Senators 
The Chamber of Senators (Cámara de Senadores) has 128 members, elected for a six-year term. 96 of these seats are in three-seat constituencies (corresponding to the nation's 31 states and Mexico City, the former Federal District which is the national capital). In these constituencies, two seats are awarded to the party with the most votes and one seat is awarded to the party with the second most votes. The remaining 32 seats are awarded by proportional representation on a nationwide basis. Senators may run for a consecutive term.

Eligibility 
Candidates for the Chamber of Senators must be registered voters at least 25 years old. They also must have been born in, or been residents of the states they are running in for at least six months. Electoral magistrates, the Secretary of the Electoral Tribunal, and the Executive Secretary and Executive Director of the INE must separate themselves from their positions for at least three years before seeking legislative office.

State and municipal level 
At the local level, each of Mexico's 31 constituent states elects a governor to serve a six-year term; they also elect legislative deputies who sit in state congresses, and municipal presidents (presidentes municipales, or mayors). Mexico City, the national capital, elects a head of government in lieu of a mayor, city assemblymen in lieu of state congressional deputies, and borough mayors in lieu of municipal mayors.

State level

Governor 
To be a Governor of a state of Mexico:

 State-born candidates must have been a resident for three years previous to the election
 Mexicans born outside of the state must have been residents for five years previous to the election
 Candidates must be at least 30 years old
 Candidates cannot have been a minister of any religion for five years previous to the election
 Candidates cannot have been in the military or a head of public security forces for 90 days previous to the election
 Candidates cannot have citizenship in any country other than Mexico

State legislature 
Members of the state legislature (Legislatura del Estado) are elected to three-year terms. Forty-five seats are apportioned in direct elections in single-member districts and 30 are apportioned via proportional appointments. Political parties nominate their candidates for proportional appointments before the election. For a party to be eligible for proportional-appointment seats they must run candidates in at least 30 districts and receive at least 3% of the vote throughout the state.

Deputies can serve up to four consecutive terms.

Similar to the federal Chamber of Deputies, a party cannot have more than 8% more seats in the legislature than their percentage of state-wide votes (e.g., to win 50% of the legislative seats, a party must win at least 42% of the vote statewide) unless that excess was earned in the direct elections.

To be a deputy of the legislature:

 State-born candidates must have been a resident for one year previous to the election
 Mexicans born outside of the state must have been residents for three years previous to the election
 Candidates must be at least 21 years old
 Candidates cannot have been a minister of any religion for five years previous to the election
 Candidates cannot have worked for any election commission for two years previous to the election
 Candidates cannot have been a sitting municipal or federal legislator for 90 days previous to the election
 Candidates cannot have been a sitting judge for 90 days previous to the election
 Candidates cannot have been in the military or a head of public security forces for 90 days previous to the election
 Candidates cannot be a sitting governor

Political parties 
Mexico has a multi-party system, with three dominant political parties. Prior to 2000 Mexico had a dominant-party system under the Institutional Revolutionary Party, and a number of smaller opposition parties. Alliances and coalitions are common: normally, they are local (state) affairs and involve one of the big three and any number of minor parties, though in extraordinary occasions two of the big three will ally themselves against the third (e.g., 2003 Colima state election or 2004 Chihuahua state election).

Voter eligibility 
In order to be able to vote, all Mexican citizens must obtain a photographic voter identification card from the National Electoral Institute (Instituto Nacional Electoral [INE]). To receive a card, potential voters need:

 Proof of either their birth in Mexico or their naturalization
 Some form of photo ID
 Proof of their residence

With these three documents, a potential voter can request their Credentials to Vote card (Credencial para Votar).

Indigenous communities 
Article 2 of the Mexican constitution provides for the self-government of indigenous communities according to their 'traditional customs' (Spanish: sistema de usos y costumbres). This has resulted in several indigenous communities in Mexico maintaining local systems, notably those of Cherán, and areas under Councils of Good Government control.

Schedule

Election

Inauguration

Federal elections

Latest elections

2018 general election

2021 legislative election

State elections
2009 Mexican local elections
2008 Mexican local elections
2007 Mexican local elections
2006 Mexican local elections
2005 Mexican local elections
2004 Mexican local elections
2003 Mexican local elections

See also
 Electoral calendar
 Electoral system

References

External links
 Election 2012 Mexico official website.
IFE website
Mexico page of the ACE Project
Adam Carr's Election Archive
Electionworld